Rudymar Fleming Pernil (born October 26, 1980) is a female judoka from Venezuela, who won the silver medal in the women's lightweight division (– 57 kg) at the 2003 Pan American Games in Santo Domingo, Dominican Republic. She represented her native country at the 2004 Summer Olympics in Athens, Greece.

References
 sports-reference

1980 births
Living people
Venezuelan female judoka
Judoka at the 2003 Pan American Games
Judoka at the 2004 Summer Olympics
Olympic judoka of Venezuela
Pan American Games silver medalists for Venezuela
Pan American Games medalists in judo
Medalists at the 2003 Pan American Games
20th-century Venezuelan women
21st-century Venezuelan women